South Korean singer and actress Bae Suzy, known mononymously as Suzy, has released two extended plays, nine singles, and four promotional singles.

Extended plays

Singles

As lead artist

As featured artist

Collaborations

Soundtrack appearances

Other charted songs

Promotional singles

Songwriting and composing credits

Music videos

See also 
 Miss A discography

Notes

References 

Discographies of South Korean artists
K-pop discographies